Sarkhej is an area and a municipality in Ahmedabad district in the Indian state of Gujarat.

Demographics
 India census, Sarkhej had a population of 23,086. Males constitute 52% of the population and females 48%. Sarkhej has an average literacy rate of 65%, higher than the national average of 59.5%: male literacy is 74%, and female literacy is 56%. In Sarkhej, 14% of the population is under 6 years of age.

References

Cities and towns in Ahmedabad district